Processor Control Region (PCR) is a Windows kernel mode data structure that contains information about the current processor. It can be accessed via the fs segment register on x86 versions, or the gs segment register on x64 versions respectively.

Structure
In Windows, the PCR is known as KPCR. It contains information about the current processor.

Processor Control Block
The PCR contains a substructure called Processor Control Block (KPRCB), which contains information such as CPU step and a pointer to the thread object of the current thread.

See also
Process Environment Block
Process control block

References
http://www.nirsoft.net/kernel_struct/vista/KPCR.html
http://www.nirsoft.net/kernel_struct/vista/KPRCB.html

Windows NT kernel
Data structures by computing platform